Quni may refer to:

 Quni, Iran or Guni, an Iranian village
 Quni, Hebei or Ch‘ü-ni, a former Chinese town in what is now Shunping County, Hebei